
Gmina Żabia Wola is a rural gmina (administrative district) in Grodzisk Mazowiecki County, Masovian Voivodeship, in east-central Poland. Its seat is the village of Żabia Wola, which lies approximately 9 kilometres (5 mi) south-east of Grodzisk Mazowiecki and 31 km (19 mi) south-west of Warsaw.

Villages
Gmina Żabia Wola contains the villages and settlements of Bartoszówka, Bieniewiec, Bolesławek, Ciepłe, Ciepłe Pierwsze, Grzegorzewice, Grzmiąca, Grzymek, Huta Żabiowolska, Jastrzębnik, Józefina, Kaleń, Kaleń-Towarzystwo, Lasek, Lisówek, Musuły, Nowa Bukówka, Oddział, Ojrzanów, Ojrzanów-Towarzystwo, Osowiec, Petrykozy, Pieńki Słubickie, Pieńki Zarębskie, Piotrkowice, Przeszkoda, Redlanka, Rumianka, Siestrzeń, Skuły, Słubica A, Słubica B, Słubica Dobra, Słubica-Wieś, Stara Bukówka, Władysławów, Wycinki Osowskie, Żabia Wola, Zalesie, Zaręby and Żelechów.

Neighbouring gminas
Gmina Żabia Wola is bordered by the gminas of Grodzisk Mazowiecki, Mszczonów, Nadarzyn, Pniewy, Radziejowice and Tarczyn.

References
Polish official population figures 2006

Zabia Wola
Grodzisk Mazowiecki County